Trichoglottis australiensis, commonly known as the weeping cherub orchid, is an epiphytic or lithophytic clump-forming orchid. It has thick, cord-like roots, flattened, branching stems, many thick, leathery, glossy leaves and between two and six creamy yellow flowers with reddish blotches. This orchid only occurs in tropical North Queensland.

Description
Flowering occurs from November to May.

Taxonomy and naming
Trichoglottis australiensis was first formally described in 1967 by Alick Dockrill and the description was published in The Orchadian from a specimen collected in the McIlwraith Range by Malcolm Brown. The specific epithet (australiensis) refers to Australia, the ending -ensis being a Latin suffix "denoting place", "locality" or "country".

Distribution and habitat
The weeping cherub orchid grows on trees and rocks in dense vegetation along gullies and in other humid places.

Conservation
This orchid is listed as "vulnerable" under the Queensland Government Nature Conservation Act 1992.

References

Endemic orchids of Australia
Orchids of Queensland
Plants described in 1967
australiensis